Elliott is an extinct town in Fayette County, in the U.S. state of West Virginia.

History
The community had the name of one Mr. Elliott, the proprietor of a local mill.

References

Geography of Fayette County, West Virginia